USS Instill (AM-252) was an  built for the United States Navy during World War II. She saw service in the Atlantic during World War II. She was decommissioned in February 1947 and placed in reserve. Instill was recommissioned in March 1951 during the Korean War and remained in commission until March 1954, when she was placed in reserve again. While she remained in reserve, Instill was reclassified as MSF-252 in February 1955 but never reactivated. In October 1962, she was sold to the Mexican Navy and renamed ARM DM-10. She was stricken from Mexican Navy service in 1986, but her ultimate fate is not reported in secondary sources.

U.S. Navy career 
Instill was launched 5 March 1944 by the Savannah Machine & Foundry Co., Savannah, Georgia; sponsored by Mrs. Lydia G. Mehoffey; and commissioned 22 May 1944.

After shakedown out of Little Creek, Virginia, and a few weeks of escort duty in that area, Instill was assigned to Service Force, Atlantic Fleet as a training ship. This duty continued until 11 August when she reported to Guantanamo Bay, Cuba, to operate with shakedown ships as a radar countermeasure ship. Returning to Norfolk, Virginia, 22 October, Instill remained there until 21 January 1946 when she sailed to Orange, Texas. The minesweeper decommissioned there 26 February 1947, joining the Reserve Fleet.

After the outbreak of the Korean War, Instill recommissioned 16 March 1951 and began an intensive period of training and patrol duty between Charleston, South Carolina, and Norfolk, Virginia. She continued her important minesweeping operations and patrol duty along the U.S. East Coast until she returned to Orange, Texas, 3 January 1954.

Instill decommissioned there 1 March and once again joined the Reserve Fleet. Reclassified MSF-252, 7 February 1955, she remained in the Texas Group, Atlantic Reserve Fleet until struck from the Navy List 1 May 1962, and sold in October 1962 to Mexico, and served as DM-10.

Mexican Navy career 
The former Instill was acquired by the Mexican Navy in October 1962 and renamed ARM DM-10. She was stricken from Mexican Navy service in 1986, but her ultimate fate is not reported in secondary sources.

Notes

References

External links
 

Admirable-class minesweepers
Ships built in Savannah, Georgia
1944 ships
World War II minesweepers of the United States
Admirable-class minesweepers of the Mexican Navy